John Alexander Maclean  (born 27 April 1946) is a former Australian Test cricketer who played in four Test matches and two One Day Internationals in 1978 and 1979. A wicket-keeper, Maclean played for Australia following the defection of many of the leading Australian cricketers to the competing World Series Cricket competition.

The Queensland Cricket Association (QCA) granted Maclean a benefit in the 1978/79 season; only the second benefit (after Sam Trimble) granted by the QCA. He was made a Member of the Order of the British Empire in 1980 for his services to cricket.

Maclean was educated at Brisbane State High School. He has bachelor's degrees in engineering (civil) and economics from the University of Queensland. 

In 2007, Maclean was the Workgroup Manager of Land and Infrastructure Development at Opus International Consultants in Brisbane as well as an advisor to the Queensland Academy of Sport (QAS) through the QAS Board. Before this position Maclean was chairman of Development Planning Pty Ltd and a director of Farr Evrat Engineers and Tabletop Architects and Planners.

Family
Maclean has four adult sons.

References

1946 births
Living people
Australia Test cricketers
Australia One Day International cricketers
Queensland cricketers
Queensland cricket captains
Australian cricketers
Australian Members of the Order of the British Empire
People educated at Brisbane State High School
Cricketers from Brisbane
Wicket-keepers